Érica Rocha de Sena (born 3 May 1985) is a female racewalker from Brazil. In the 20 km walk, she took 4th place at the 2017 World Championships, and 7th place at the 2016 Summer Olympics. She is the only Brazilian to win a medal at the IAAF World Race Walking Team Championships, after inheriting the 20 km race bronze in the 2016 race, held in Rome.

Career
In the same event, Sena also has the country's best racewalking performance by a woman at the Olympic Games, with a seventh place in the 2016 Rio de Janeiro games, and the World Championships in Athletics, a sixth place in 2015, held in Beijing, China.

She competed at the 2020 Summer Olympics.

Personal life
She is married to an Ecuadorian race walker, Andrés Chocho.

Personal bests

Road walk
10 km: 43:03 min –  Suzhou, 25 Sep 2017
20 km: 1:26:59 hrs –  London, 13 Aug 2017

Track walk
5000 m: 23:10.59 min –  Campinas, 7 Nov 2011
10,000 m: 43:41.30 min –  São Paulo, 1 Aug 2014
20,000 m: 1:35:29.6 h –  São Paulo, 5 Aug 2011

References

External links

1985 births
Living people
Sportspeople from Pernambuco
Brazilian female racewalkers
World Athletics Championships athletes for Brazil
Pan American Games athletes for Brazil
Pan American Games silver medalists for Brazil
Pan American Games bronze medalists for Brazil
Pan American Games medalists in athletics (track and field)
Athletes (track and field) at the 2011 Pan American Games
Athletes (track and field) at the 2015 Pan American Games
Athletes (track and field) at the 2019 Pan American Games
Athletes (track and field) at the 2016 Summer Olympics
Athletes (track and field) at the 2020 Summer Olympics
Olympic athletes of Brazil
South American Games bronze medalists for Brazil
South American Games medalists in athletics
Competitors at the 2014 South American Games
Medalists at the 2015 Pan American Games
Medalists at the 2019 Pan American Games
21st-century Brazilian women